The 2007–08 Iranian Futsal Super League will be the 4th season of the Futsal Super League.

League standings

Results table

Top goalscorers 
52 Goals
  Mohammad Taheri (Shahid Mansouri)

Awards 

 Winner: Tam Iran Khodro
 Runners-up: Shahid Mansouri
 Third-Place: Foolad Mahan
 Top scorer:  Mohammad Taheri (Shahid Mansouri) (52)

See also 
 2007–08 Iran Futsal's 1st Division
 2007–08 Persian Gulf Cup
 2007–08 Azadegan League
 2007–08 Iran Football's 2nd Division
 2007–08 Iran Football's 3rd Division
 2007–08 Hazfi Cup
 Iranian Super Cup

References

Futsal Planet 
Futsal News 

Iranian Futsal Super League seasons
1